This is a list of Boxcar Children Novels.

The Boxcar Children novels
The first nineteen books in the series were written by Gertrude Chandler Warner, the series's original author. Subsequent books were written by others after her death in 1979.

Written by Gertrude Chandler Warner

Written by other authors

Lists of novels

Lists of novels
{

The Boxcar Children Great Adventure

The Boxcar Children Interactive Mysteries

The Boxcar Children Creatures of Legend

The Boxcar Children Endangered Animals

The Boxcar Children Summer of Adventure

The Boxcar Children Specials Series

Prequel

How-To Guide

References

External links

 A list of the Boxcar Children books
 A list of the Special books
 Boxcar Children main page from Albert Whitman and Company
 Boxcar Children books page from Albert Whitman and Company